Hatherwood Battery (map reference ) is a battery located to the east of Alum Bay on the Isle of Wight. It is one of the many Palmerston Forts built on the island to protect it in response to a perceived French invasion. It was sited to cross fire with the nearby Needles Battery

Originally designed to mount six 68 Pounder guns, construction of the battery began in 1865. Before it was completed it was decided to mount seven guns in three groups. This comprised two 9-inch Rifled Muzzle Loading (RML) guns on each flank and three 7-inch Rifled Breech Loading (RBL) guns in the centre. The battery was complete by 1869. There was no accommodation at the battery for the soldiers who would man it. Instead these men were billetted at nearby Golden Hill Fort. In 1903 the battery was officially disarmed.

Today not much is left of the battery as it has been left to decay, with some parts falling off the cliff due to erosion.

References

Publications
 
 

Forts on the Isle of Wight
Palmerston Forts
Infrastructure completed in 1869
Artillery batteries
1869 establishments in England